This is the episode list of , a Japanese tokusatsu television series produced by Tsuburaya Productions that is set to be aired on TV Tokyo on July 8, 2017. The series is simulcasted outside Japan by Crunchyroll.

At the end of each episode, a minisode called  aired and featuring Riku Asakura described the Ultra Capsule and Monster Capsule of said episode.

Episodes



References

External links
Episode Lists on Ultraman Geed

Geed